OTL may stand for:
 Oradea Transport Local
 Over-the-line, a variant of softball played mostly in Southern California
 Over time limit
 Output transformerless, a vacuum tube amplifier topology
 Outside the Lines, an American sports television series focusing on off-the-field stories
 Oracle Template Library
 An emoticon representing a kneeling or bowing person
 Overtime loss in ice hockey
 Otl Aicher, a graphic designer and typographer
 South Airlines, by ICAO airline code
 Ottawa Tool Library
 On the Loose, an outing club for the Claremont Colleges in Claremont, California, United States